Catriona Millar (born 1956) is a Scottish figurative painter born in Milngavie, Glasgow. She studied at Grays School of Art, Aberdeen, where her tutors included Joyce Cairns RSA and Keith Grant. Since the success of her 2005 degree show she has exhibited across the UK including the Royal Scottish Academy, Edinburgh. Her works are in both private and public collections. In October 2006 she came to the attention of Charles Saatchi with her first solo exhibition at the Dundas Street Gallery, Edinburgh. In April 2007 The Herald ranked her in the top five most collectable artists in Scotland.

In 2012 she moved from Scotland to England, and currently resides in East Sussex.

References

External links
Artist's website

1956 births
Living people
20th-century Scottish painters
20th-century Scottish women artists
21st-century Scottish painters
21st-century Scottish women artists
Alumni of Gray's School of Art
Artists from Glasgow
Scottish women painters